The Lords of the New Church is the debut studio album by the English/American rock band The Lords of the New Church. It was released in 1982 by Illegal Records in the UK and by I.R.S. Records in the US.

The album was well-received at the time and peaked at #3 on the UK Indie Chart with the single "Open Your Eyes" reaching #7 on the UK Indie Chart, #34 on the Canadian charts and #27 on the US Rock chart. Two other singles also made the UK Indie Chart: "New Church" (#34) and "Russian Roulette" (#12).

Background 
The Lords of the New Church were formed in 1981 by singer Stiv Bators and guitarist Brian James, who had been founding members of Cleveland's Dead Boys and London's the Damned, respectively. The two experimented for a time with different rhythm sections, before bassist Dave Tregunna (ex-Sham 69) and drummer Nicky Turner (ex-the Barracudas) joined the fold. Their first recordings as a band was the debut single "New Church" and its B-side "Livin' on Livin'", after which they recorded the rest of the album. It was recorded at Farmyard Studios in England and produced by the band themselves. Stiv Bators said in 1986: "The Lords was a definite sound that I had in my head ... the jungle rhythms and sort of an eerie voodoo guitar. Brian had almost the same sound in his head."

"Russian Roulette", which took lyrical inspiration from the film Apocalypse Now, had been introduced to the Lords during their first rehearsals with the song's writers, bassist Tony James and drummer Terry Chimes. Brian James: "When Stiv  and I started forming the Lords, we were looking for bass and drum set up. First of all we started playing with Tony James and Terry Chimes and we rehearsed a few times with that set up, just kind of messing about, feeling it out." This constellation lasted three months, according to Tony James, but "Russian Roulette" stayed and made the album. Tony James: "I actually wrote what is considered to be one of their best songs ... . If you take a look at the song credit on the label you’ll see it’s credited to James/Chimes although I wrote it all."

The Lords of the New Church was released through the labels Illegal (UK) and I.R.S. (US), both of which were co-founded by Miles Copeland, who had also taken on the band's management.

Musical style and themes 

Musically, the album is a mix of punk, glam, garage rock and goth, described by New Noise Magazine as a "seedy concoction of spidery guitars, sleazy bass lines, jungle drums and gothic keyboards."

The album saw the band expressing a "core message of personal freedom", as well as flirting with apocalyptic and religious imagery fueling criticisms about the band's apparent blasphemy. Nicky Turner said in 2018: "I think we wanted to make a mark. We wanted to be political, in a sense, which you can hear in the lyrics of songs like “New Church” and “Holy War,” you know, to create a stir."

"Li'l Boys Play with Dolls" is a tribute to the New York Dolls using lyrics and song titles from their first two albums.

Critical reception 

Critic Robert Christgau gave the album a C grade, describing the music as "new-wave Black Sabbath, complete with technoprofessional arena echo."

In a retrospective review, AllMusic's Bill Cassel gave the album a 4½-star rating, writing that while he couldn't call the album entirely successful, "for every high point like "Open Your Eyes" or "Russian Roulette" there's a clunker like "Portobello" or "Eat Your Heart Out",  he couldn't fault their effort. He concluded that the album "is very much an artifact of the Reagan era and somewhat dated in its approach, but Bators' core message of personal freedom, and the fervor and sincerity with which he delivered it, have retained their resonance across the years."

Michael Toland of Blurt magazine gave the album 4 stars out of 5, describing it as a "mélange of different sounds" with every song wrapped in "catchy licks, memorable choruses and a B-movie atmosphere." Toland felt that the album's "shiny but aggressive blend of garage rock, gothic pop and glam punk" should sound dated, but that the band’s "distinctive personality and strong songwriting" distinguishes them from "their more timebound peers." He concluded that The Lords of the New Church "still holds up as a classic, timeless rock & roll record."

Track listing

Chart positions

Personnel 
Credits adapted from the album's liner notes.
The Lords of the New Church

Stiv Bators – vocals
Brian James – guitar, backing vocals
Dave Tregunna – bass, backing vocals
Nicky Turner – drums, backing vocals

Additional musicians

Matt Irving – synthesizer
Steve "Rudi" Thompson – horns 
Simon Lloyd – horns

References 

1982 debut albums
The Lords of the New Church albums
Illegal Records albums
I.R.S. Records albums